Barrow Hall may refer to:

 Barrow Hall, Cheshire, a grade II-listed building in Barrow, Cheshire.
 Barrow Hall, Lincolnshire, a grade I-listed building in Barrow-upon-Humber.
 Barrow Hall, a fictional castle in the A Song of Ice and Fire series.